James Wemyss (23 February 1726 – 10 May 1786) was a Scottish naval officer and politician who sat in the House of Commons from 1763 to 1784.

Early life
Wemyss was born on 23 February 1726.  Wemyss was the third and youngest son of James Wemyss, 5th Earl of Wemyss by his wife Janet Charteris. Wemyss was educated in Edinburgh.

His eldest brother, David, Lord Elcho, was attainted in 1746, and his other older brother, Francis, adopted the name Charteris as heir to their maternal grandfather Francis Charteris, a Scottish soldier and adventurer who earned a substantial sum of money through gambling and the South Sea Bubble. Therefore, James was named heir to the Wemyss estates, including Wemyss Castle, by a new entail of 31 July 1750. The 5th Earl of Wemyss died in 1756.

Career
Wemyss served in the British Navy, as a Midshipman R.N. 1741; was promoted to Lieutenant in 1745. However, his progress was slow, and soon after succeeding to the Wemyss estates, his brother Francis wrote to him urging him to quit the navy, establish himself at Wemyss Castle and marry. On 12 January 1757, Lord Temple refused his promotion request and Wemyss resigned his commission. In 1759, his friend, Richard Kempenfelt, wrote to him "The navy should not have neglected you, nor you it. Possessed of every quality to shine conspicuous, why should you shade yourself in peace when your country, when all Europe, is as in a blaze of arms?"

Wemyss was Member of Parliament for Fife from 1763 to 1768 and for Sutherland from 1768 to 1784, when he was succeeded by his son.

Personal life
On 29 August 1757, James Wemyss was married to his half-cousin Lady Elizabeth Sutherland (d. 1803), the only daughter of William Sutherland, 17th Earl of Sutherland by his wife Lady Elizabeth Wemyss, daughter of David Wemyss, 4th Earl of Wemyss. Their children included:

 Elizabeth Margaret Wemyss (d. 1800), who married MP Alexander Brodie, son of James Brodie, Sheriff of Elgin.
 William Wemyss (1760–1822), a soldier and MP who married Frances Erskine, daughter of Sir William Erskine, 1st Baronet.
 James Wemyss (1778–1849), who married Caroline Charlotte Binfield, daughter of Reverend Henry Binfield.

Wemyss died on 10 May 1786. His widow lived nearly another seventeen years until her death on 24 January 1803.

Descendants
Elizabeth Margaret was the mother of Elizabeth Gordon, Duchess of Gordon. Through his son William, he was the grandfather of Frances Wemyss (1794–1858), who married James St Clair-Erskine, 3rd Earl of Rosslyn; Rear-Admiral James Erskine Wemyss (1789–1854); Lieutenant-General William Wemyss (1790–1852); and Clementina Wemyss (1805–1834), who married with James Dewar, Chief Justice of The Supreme Court, Bombay.

References

1726 births
1786 deaths
Members of the Parliament of Great Britain for Scottish constituencies
Younger sons of earls
British MPs 1761–1768
British MPs 1768–1774
British MPs 1774–1780
British MPs 1780–1784
Royal Navy officers